The 2004–05 Idaho Vandals men's basketball team represented the University of Idaho during the 2004–05 NCAA Division I men's basketball season. Members of the Big West Conference, the Vandals were led by fourth-year head coach Leonard Perry and played their home games on campus at Cowan Spectrum in Moscow, Idaho.

This was Idaho's ninth and final season in the Big West and their overall record in the conference tourney was 1–7; they moved to the Western Athletic Conference (WAC) over the summer.

Postseason result

|-
!colspan=5 style=| Big West tournament

References

External links
Sports Reference – Idaho Vandals: 2004–05 basketball season
Idaho Argonaut – student newspaper – 2005 editions

Idaho Vandals men's basketball seasons
Idaho
Idaho Vandals men's basketball team
Idaho Vandals men's basketball team